Getters Talmud Torah also known as Beis Shlomo Cheder was an orthodox Jewish private school in Stamford Hill, London. The school was associated with the Union of Orthodox Hebrew Congregations and catered for boys aged 3 to 13.

The head of the school was Rabbi Moshe Shmuel Rotenberg, the Kossoner Rabbi of London.

History 
The school was founded in 2000.

The school stopped teaching secular subjects other than English and maths in January 2017, providing pupils' parents with a contract for them to sign accepting responsibility for their children's secular educations. Boys were also not taught about women's contributions to society or about other cultures.

The school received four full inspections from Ofsted, three of which were rated "inadequate". The school was closed on 20 July 2018 following a deregistration order from the Department for Education.

References 

Haredi Judaism in the United Kingdom
Defunct schools in the London Borough of Hackney
Jewish schools in England
Orthodox Jewish educational institutions
Orthodox Judaism in London
Educational institutions established in 2000
Educational institutions disestablished in 2018
2000 establishments in England
2018 disestablishments in England